Kallio Rolling Rainbow (KRR) is a women's flat track roller derby league based in Helsinki in Finland. Founded in 2010, the league consists of three teams, plus two mixed travel teams which compete against teams from other leagues. Kallio is a member of the Women's Flat Track Derby Association (WFTDA).

International presence
Three skaters from Kallio (Misbitch, Pink Spanker and Udre) were selected to play for Team Finland at the 2011 Roller Derby World Cup in Toronto, and a higher proportion of the squad for the 2014 Cup came from the league.

During 2013, Kallio played in the first Suomi Cup of roller derby, winning the tournament by defeating Helsinki Roller Derby in the final. Kallio has won the national Finnish league Suomi Cup also in 2015 and 2016.

WFTDA competition
In October 2013, Kallio was accepted as a member of the Women's Flat Track Derby Association Apprentice Programme, and became a full member in July 2014. In 2016, Kallio qualified for their first appearance at WFTDA Division 1 Playoffs, entering the Montreal tournament as the seventh seed, ultimately going winless and finishing the weekend in tenth place. In 2017 Kallio was the ninth seed at the Malmö Division 1 Playoff but again went winless, losing 269–162 to Detroit Roller Derby and to Stockholm Roller Derby, 184–166.

In 2018, Kallio qualified for the WFTDA European Continental Cup held in Birmingham, England as the first seed, and went unbeaten in capturing first place.

Rankings

 CR = consolation round

References

Roller derby leagues in Finland
Roller derby leagues established in 2010
Sports competitions in Helsinki
Women's sport in Finland
Women's Flat Track Derby Association Division 1
2010 establishments in Finland
Women's sports leagues in Finland